Dominic Vetro (born May 26, 1958, in St. Lawrence, Newfoundland) is a former Canadian football player who played with the Montreal Alouettes, Montreal Concordes and Hamilton Tiger-Cats as a wide receiver and return specialist. Vetro caught 10 passes for 129 yards and 0 receiving touchdowns in his career. He also returned 29 punts for 337 yards and 22 kickoffs for 480 yards.

References 

Living people
1958 births
People from St. Lawrence, Newfoundland and Labrador
Players of Canadian football from Newfoundland and Labrador
Canadian football wide receivers
Canadian football return specialists
Wilfrid Laurier Golden Hawks football players
Montreal Alouettes players
Montreal Concordes players
Hamilton Tiger-Cats players